1-acyl-sn-glycerol-3-phosphate acyltransferase alpha is an enzyme that in humans is encoded by the AGPAT1 gene.

This gene encodes an enzyme that converts lysophosphatidic acid (LPA) into phosphatidic acid (PA). LPA and PA are two phospholipids involved in signal transduction and in lipid biosynthesis in cells. This enzyme localizes to the endoplasmic reticulum. This gene is located in the class III region of the human major histocompatibility complex. Alternative splicing results in two transcript variants encoding the same protein.

References

External links

Further reading